João Carlos de Castro Ferreira (born 12 February 1987), known as João Carlos, is a Brazilian footballer who plays as a forward for São Bernardo.

Club career
Born in Duque de Caxias, Rio de Janeiro, João Carlos began his career in the youth sides of Tigres do Brasil, but left the side to work in a sawmill in his hometown.

João Carlos subsequently played for Duque de Caxias, Resende and America-RJ before returning to Arraial in 2008, where he impressed enough to earn a trial at South African side Golden Arrows in August of that year. On 27 January 2009, he moved to Metropolitano, but was separated from the squad in less than a month after arriving.

João Carlos subsequently signed for Mesquita, but finished the 2009 season back at Arraial.

João Carlos was a spotlight of Arraial during the 2012 Campeonato Carioca Série C, and returned to Duque for the 2012 Série C. On 4 December 2013, he agreed to a deal with Macaé, and was the club's top scorer as they won the 2014 Série C.

Ahead of the 2015 season, João Carlos joined Madureira, where he featured regularly. On 21 April 2016, he was announced at Cuiabá on loan, but only played twice before fracturing his tibia in the following month.

After recovering in the middle of 2017, João Carlos played for Madureira before returning to Cuiabá in 2018, also on loan. Now a regular starter, he helped the side to achieve promotion before signing for Volta Redonda on 11 December 2018.

On 23 July 2020, João Carlos renewed his contract with Voltaço until 2022, but was loaned to Mirassol on 2 December.

On 12 May 2021, João Carlos was loaned to São Bernardo for the latter stages of the year's Campeonato Paulista Série A2. After achieving promotion, he terminated his contract with Volta Redonda on 21 July 2021, and returned to São Bernardo for the 2021 Copa Paulista.

Regularly used for Bernô, João Carlos won the 2021 Copa Paulista with the side and achieved promotion from the 2022 Série D. On 22 October 2022, aged 35, he renewed his contract for a further year.

Career statistics

Honours

Club
Duque de Caxias
Copa Rio: 2013

Macaé
Campeonato Brasileiro Série C: 2014

Mirassol
Campeonato Brasileiro Série D: 2020

São Bernardo
Copa Paulista: 2021

Individual
Campeonato Carioca top goalscorer: 2020 (8 goals, shared with Gabriel Barbosa)

References

1987 births
Living people
People from Duque de Caxias, Rio de Janeiro
Sportspeople from Rio de Janeiro (state)
Brazilian footballers
Association football forwards
Campeonato Brasileiro Série C players
Campeonato Brasileiro Série D players
Duque de Caxias Futebol Clube players
Resende Futebol Clube players
America Football Club (RJ) players
Clube Atlético Metropolitano players
Mesquita Futebol Clube players
Macaé Esporte Futebol Clube players
Madureira Esporte Clube players
Cuiabá Esporte Clube players
Volta Redonda FC players
Mirassol Futebol Clube players
São Bernardo Futebol Clube players